Kingsway College School (KCS) is a JK to Grade 12 co-ed private independent school founded in 1989. The Junior School is located on Dundas Street West in The Kingsway area of Etobicoke and the Senior School is located on Lake Shore Boulevard West in west Toronto, Ontario, Canada.

References
Kingsway College School
Kingsway College School profile at Our Kids
Kingsway College School on the Conference of Independent Schools of Ontario website

Private schools in Toronto